TransAsia Airways (TNA, until January 1992 known by its Chinese-translated name Foshing Airlines) was a Taiwanese airline based in Neihu District in Taipei. Though the company started its operations focusing mainly on the Taiwanese domestic market, it operated on many scheduled international routes and focused mainly on Southeast and Northeast Asia and cross-strait flights at the time of closure.

TransAsia suspended operations and shut down indefinitely on 22 November 2016 after a pair of hull loss incidents that occurred within months. Its low-cost subsidiary V Air had already ceased operations in October 2016.

History

Foshing Airlines 
On 21 May 1951, FOSHIN TRANSPORT CORP. (Foshing Airlines) was formed as the first private civil airline in Taiwan, flying the Taipei - Hualien - Taitung - Kaohsiung route. It also served as local agent for foreign airlines and provided airport ground handling services for foreign airlines.

On 16 October 1958, the management of the airline decided to concentrate its attention on the agency businesses, ceasing domestic services, and strengthening the agency business. It established its airline meal catering services at Song Shan Airport (TSA) in 1966. The airline completed a restructure in 1983 and in 1988, domestic flights resumed after a 30-year absence from the market. In 1991, the first ATR 72 aircraft joined the airline.

TransAsia Airways 
Upon launching international routes in January 1992, the English translation changed to "TransAsia Airways" while the Chinese name remained the same. In 1992, unscheduled charter services to international destinations, including Laoag, Manila, Cebu, Phnom Penh, Surabaya, Yangon, Phuket, Danang, and Manado, started. The Airbus A320 joined the fleet, becoming the airline's first jet aircraft.

In 1995, the first scheduled international services started to Macau and Surabaya. In early 2012, the airline was reported to be considering an order for Airbus A380 aircraft to facilitate expansion to the United States.

On 1 November 2011, TransAsia Airways was listed on the Taiwan Stock Exchange. In May 2013, the headquarters moved from Datong District, Taipei to Neihu District, Taipei.

In January 2014, the airline announced plans to launch a budget airline named V Air. It commenced operations in December of that year. The budget airline closed on 1 October 2016 and merged with TransAsia.

On 21 November 2016, due to a financial crisis caused by the crashes of Flight 222 and Flight 235, the airline suspended all operations and refunded ticketed passengers. The trading of its stock was suspended simultaneously. The next day, the airline announced an indefinite suspension of operations and refunded all passengers with outstanding tickets. As of 2017, some routes operated by TransAsia Airways have been reopened by EVA air, specifically Taipei Songshan to Chongqing, Hangzhou (operated by UNI air), and Tianjin.

On 11 January 2017, the company's shareholders voted to liquidate it.

On 29 June 2018, the company entered bankruptcy and its license was permanently revoked on July 1.

Corporate affairs

Ground services
Besides flight operations, the airline undertook ground handling and ticketing for a number of foreign airlines, such as Thai Airways, Jetstar Airways, XiamenAir, Sichuan Airlines, and Cebu Pacific Air. In addition, private jet service was also part of agency services. Since 2006, the airline had cooperated with International SOS to serve medical flights between Mainland China and Taiwan. The airline began its catering service near the Taipei SongShan Airport in 1966 and was officially named TransAsia Catering Services in 2002. Legend Travel Service Ltd, founded in 2011, provided travel- and tourism-related services under the airline group resources.

Brand and livery
TransAsia Airways introduced a new livery for both staff and aircraft in 2012. Former Shiatzy Chen designer Yin Pei Gun was responsible for the new cabin attendant and ground staff uniforms that appeared that August. The new plane livery, designed by local Taipei company Pace Design, was to be painted on the new Airbus A330, A321ceo, A321neo, and ATR 72-600.

Destinations 
As of November 2016, when it ceased its operations, TransAsia Airways served the following destinations:

Before its dissolution, TransAsia Airways was to open routes to Fukuoka, Busan, and Bangkok in December 2016.

Codeshare agreements
TransAsia Airways had codeshare agreements with the following airlines:

 Shenzhen Airlines 
 Sichuan Airlines
 XiamenAir

Fleet 

At the time the airline suspended its operations, the TransAsia Airways fleet consisted of the following aircraft:

Historically, TransAsia also operated the following aircraft:

 Airbus A320
 Airbus A321
 Airbus A330 (Dry-leased to Avianca)
 ATR 42

Most of the TransAsia fleet was leased and quickly reclaimed by lessors after TransAsia shut down, leaving just the ATR fleet, two Airbus A321 aircraft, and two Airbus A330-300 aircraft, which had been owned by TransAsia. The Airbus aircraft were auctioned off to Avianca for US$364 million, financed by a sale-leaseback on Avianca's end. After the disposal of the Airbus aircraft to Avianca, only the 7 ATR 72-600 remained, initially stored at Taoyuan International Airport, but reregistered to the Guernsey civil register and since moved to Mönchengladbach Airport.

Services

Business Class
The business class seating offered on the Airbus A330-300 was in a 2-2-2 configuration, using seats with a 172-degree recline. Each seat had an AVOD system with a 15.4-inch monitor, AC and USB sockets, adjustable reading lights, and multiple storage bins.
The seats on the Airbus A320-200 and Airbus A321-100 used a 2-2 seating configuration, with a 160-degree recline.

Economy Class
Economy Class was in a 2-4-2 configuration on the Airbus A330, a 3-3 configuration on the Airbus A320 and Airbus A321, and a 2-2 configuration on the ATR series. The seats had a pitch of 30 to 32 inches and a 6-degree recline. The AVOD system was only on the Airbus A330, with a 9-inch monitor.

In-flight amenities
The In-flight entertainment system of TransAsia Airways, named Sky Legend, used Panasonic's eX2 IFE system. It contained real-time flight information, music, movies, and video games. Available languages were English, Japanese, Traditional Chinese, and Simplified Chinese. Renaissance was the in-flight magazine published by TransAsia Airways; it had content in Traditional Chinese, English, and Japanese. The magazine introduced culture, arts, food, people, design, and style from its destinations.

Accidents and incidents 
On 30 January 1995, TransAsia Airways Flight 510A, an ATR 72-200 (registration B-22717), crashed into a hillside during flight from Penghu to Taipei. All four crew members died.
On 6 January 1996, a man, disappointed with domestic political and social developments in Taiwan, hijacked TransAsia Airways Flight 529, an Airbus A321-131, en route to Tainan. He gave a note to one of the flight attendants, claiming to have a bomb. He demanded that the aircraft be flown to Fujian Province, China. The hijacker agreed to allow the crew to land the aircraft in Tainan for refueling; he was arrested after the aircraft landed.
On December 21, 2002, Flight 791, an ATR 72-200 (registration B-22708), crashed due to icing during a flight from Taipei to Macau. Both crew members died. The aircraft encountered severe icing conditions beyond the certification envelope of the aircraft for such conditions and crashed into the sea 17 km southwest of Makung city. The investigation by the Aviation Safety Council of Taiwan found that the crash was caused by ice accumulation around the aircraft's major components, resulting in the crew losing control. The investigation identified that the flight crew did not respond to the severe icing conditions with the appropriate alert situation awareness and did not take the necessary actions.
On March 21, 2003, Flight 543, an Airbus A321-131 (registration B-22603), collided with a truck while landing at Tainan Airport at the end of a flight from Taipei Songshan Airport. The truck trespassed onto the runway without its occupants noticing the incoming aircraft. None of the 175 passengers and crew were injured but the two people inside the truck were injured in the collision. The aircraft was severely damaged in the accident and was written off.
On October 18, 2004, Flight 536, an Airbus A320-232 (registration B-22310) overran runway 10 while landing at Taipei Songshan Airport and sustained damage to its landing gear and engines. All 106 people survived without any injuries. The aircraft was repaired and returned to service.
 On 19 July 2005, Flight 028, an ATR 72-212A (B-22805), landed at Taipei Songshan Airport. As the aircraft taxied on Taxiway CC after landing, it made an early right turn onto a service road. The aircraft's right wing hit a light pole and stopped. Two pilots, two cabin attendants, and twenty-four passengers were on board. One cabin crew member suffered a minor injury. The front spar of the right wing was damaged.
On July 23, 2014, Flight 222, an ATR 72-500 registered B-22810 carrying 54 passengers and 4 crew members from Kaohsiung to Magong, crashed near Magong Airport on Penghu Island. Forty-eight people were confirmed dead while at least seven of the eleven survivors were seriously injured. Some reports suggest there were also five casualties on the ground when the aircraft impacted residential buildings. This crash was the deadliest for the airline. The cause was the pilot's intentional descent below the minimum descent altitude during an approach in a typhoon by Typhoon Matmo.
On February 4, 2015, Flight 235, an ATR 72-600 registered B-22816, had an engine failure after takeoff and crashed at 10:56a.m. local time into the Keelung River near Taipei, killing 43 of the 53 passengers and 5 crew on board. This was the second deadly crash in eight months for the airline, prompting an order to ground all of the airline's ATR pilots until they had successfully taken part in an oral exam about emergency procedures.

See also

 List of companies of Taiwan
 List of defunct airlines of Taiwan

References

External links 

TransAsia Airways
TransAsia Airways Korea
Goldsun Group (Zhwiki)

 
Defunct airlines of Taiwan
Airlines established in 1951
Airlines disestablished in 2016
1951 establishments in Taiwan